Hestiasula inermis is a species of praying mantis in the family Hymenopodidae.

See also
List of mantis genera and species

References

Hestiasula
Insects described in 1879